The Swedish-Geatish wars refer to semi-legendary 6th century battles between Swedes and Geats that are described in the Anglo-Saxon epic Beowulf. Little has survived of such battles in the Norse sagas, and later 11th century-13th century wars between Swedes and Geats, notably involving the Geatish clans House of Stenkil and House of Sverker, are referred to as Swedish civil wars.

The first war in Beowulf

The Anglo-Saxon epic relates that the Swedes did not keep the peace when the Geatish king Hreðel had died, because the Swedish king Ongenþeow's sons (i.e. Ohthere and Onela) had grown up and were eager to fight.

The Geats under their new king Hæþcyn captured the Swedish queen, but old king Ongenþeow saved her, at a hill fort called Hrefnesholt, although they lost her gold. Ongenþeow killed Hæþcyn, and besieged the Geats at Hrefnesholt. The Geats were, however, rescued by Hygelac, Hæþcyn's brother, who arrived the next day with reinforcements. Having lost the battle, but rescued his queen, Ongenþeow and his warriors returned home:

However, the war was not over. Hygelac, the new king of the Geats, attacked the Swedes: 

The Geatish warriors Eofor and Wulf Wonreding fought together against the hoary king Ongenþeow. Wulf hit Ongenþeow's head with his sword so that the old king bled over his hair, but the king hit back and wounded Wulf. Then, Eofor retaliated by cutting through the Swedish king's shield and through his helmet, giving Ongenþeow a death-blow. Eofor took the Swedish king's helmet, sword and breastplate and carried them to Hygelac. When they came home, Eofor and Wulf were richly awarded, and Eofor was given Hygelac's daughter. Because of this battle, Hygelac is referred to as Ongenþeow's slayer.

The second war in Beowulf
In Sweden, both Ongenþeow and Ohthere were apparently dead as Onela was king, and Ohthere's two sons, Eanmund and Eadgils, sought refuge with Heardred, Hygelac's successor as king of the Geats. This caused Onela to attack the Geats. During the battle, Eanmund was killed by Onela's champion Weohstan and Heardred was killed as well. Onela returned home and Beowulf became king of the Geats.

Eadgils, however, survived and later, Beowulf helped him avenge Eanmund by slaying Onela, an event which also appears in Scandinavian sources, as the Battle on the Ice of Lake Vänern (although no Geatish involvement is remembered or mentioned).

The foreboding of a third war in Beowulf
As Wiglaf sat beside the dead king Beowulf, he spoke of a new war with the Swedes that would surely come:

Aftermath

According to a Scandinavian legend written down in the 13th century, in the Ynglinga saga, a 7th-century Geatish king named Algaut was invited to his son-in-law, the Swedish king Ingjald, at Uppsala. During the night, he was burned to death together with a number of other invited kings. Ingjald then extended his rule to include the Geatish heartland in Västergötland, whereas the East Geats in Östergötland preserved their independence. The Geats and the other Scandinavians were later united by Ivar Vidfamne.

Sögubrot af nokkrum fornkonungum says that after Ivar's death, the kingdom was split between Harald Wartooth and Sigurd Hring. Harald ruled Denmark and the East Geats, whereas Sigurd Hring ruled Sweden and the West Geats. These and many sources describe how these two kings met in the legendary and enormous Battle of the Brávellir (c. 750), where Sigurd Hring was victorious and became the king of both Swedes, Geats and Danes. From this battle and onwards, all of Geatland is described as part of the Swedish kingdom.

In the 12th century, Geatish tribal independence was but a memory as the Danish chronicler Saxo Grammaticus noted in his Gesta Danorum (book 13) that the Geats had no say in the election of the king, only the Swedes. It says even more of their loss of independence that when the Law of the West Geats was put to paper, in the 13th century, the law stated that the election and the deposing of the king rested with the Swedes and not with the Geats.

In 1442, the law of the Swedish, Norwegian and Danish king Christopher of Bavaria, declared that the merging of Geatland into the Swedish kingdom took place in a distant pagan time.

Notes

Bibliography
Lundström, I. (1972). Viking, viking. Forntidsdröm och verklighet. Statens historiska museum, Stockholm. p. 6.
Nerman, B. (1925). Det svenska rikets uppkomst. Stockholm.

External links
 Old English edition edited by James Albert Harrison and Robert Sharp
Translations of Beowulf:
 Modern English translation by Francis Barton Gummere
 Modern English translation by John Lesslie Hall

English heroic legends
Geats
Battles involving Sweden
Götaland